William Mocquet (born 23 January 1983 in Valognes) is a French footballer who plays for AS Moulins. Mocquet, who has been capped for the French Under-21 side, is a midfielder.

Mocquet left Le Havre and signed for Sunderland on 22 August 2006 for an undisclosed fee, in a two-year deal. However, he found himself on the sidelines and was loaned to League Two sides Rochdale (where he scored once against Boston United) and Bury. He was released at the end of the 2006-07 season.

References

External links

1983 births
Living people
French footballers
France under-21 international footballers
Association football midfielders
Le Havre AC players
Louhans-Cuiseaux FC players
Sunderland A.F.C. players
Rochdale A.F.C. players
Bury F.C. players
AS Moulins players
Pau FC players